County Road 828 is a  road in Nordland County, Norway. It is also locally named Hæstadveien (Hæstad Road), Seløyveien (Seløy Road), Brunsvikveien (Brunsvik Road), Nord-Herøyveien (North Herøy Road), Sør-Herøyveien (South Herøy Road), Fagervikveien (Fagervik Road), and Flostadveien (Flostad Road).

The road runs from the ferry terminal at the village of Bjørn in the municipality of Dønna along the south coast of the island of Dønna, passing through the village of Hestad.  At the southern part of the island, it crosses the Åkviksundet Bridge and passes over several small islands, including Staulen, Skardsøya, Kjeøya, and Hestøya, before reaching the island of Nord-Herøy in the municipality of Herøy. There one branch of the road runs northeast to the ferry terminal at Engan. The other branch runs southwest along the length of Nord-Herøy, crosses Herøysundet (Herøy Strait) via the Herøysund Bridge to the island of Sør-Herøy, turns south at Herøy School (Sentralskolen), and then turns east at Kjerkåsen before terminating at the ferry terminal at Flostad.

References

External links
Statens vegvesen – trafikkmeldinger Fv828 (Traffic Information: County Road 828)

828
Herøy, Nordland
Dønna